The National Museum of Saint Kitts is a museum in Basseterre, Saint George Basseterre Parish, Saint Kitts and Nevis. It is run by the St. Christopher National Trust.

History
The current museum building was originally constructed as Treasury Building in 1894. It was once used as the entry port from the nearby pier. In 1996, the treasury moved to a new building. In 2002, the museum was finally opened.

Geology
The museum building once stood at the waterfront south of Saint Kitts Island facing the Basseterre Bay. Now the area south of the building has been reclaimed.

Architecture
The museum spans over an area of 900 m2.

Exhibitions
The museum showcases the culture and heritage of Saint Kitts and Nevis.

See also
 List of museums in Saint Kitts and Nevis

References

2002 establishments in North America
Buildings and structures in Basseterre
Museums established in 2002
Museums in Saint Kitts and Nevis